Ready is the third EP by English singer and songwriter Ella Mai. The extended play is the third of the trilogy leading up to her debut album. It was released by 10 Summers and produced by DJ Mustard.

Singles
The song "Anymore" was released a week prior to the EP as a promotional single. In early 2018 "Boo'd Up" started receiving unexpected attention, and was released as a single accompanied by a music video on 26 April, as Ella Mai topped the Emerging Artists chart. The song also topped the YouTube songs chart and Billboard Hot R&B chart in the US.

Critical reception
EarMilk said "On each of her EPs – Time, Change, and Ready – Mai is poignant in her delivery of unashamed lyrics. Her mature navigation of love becomes more poignant and straightforward with each release. DJ Mustard found a secret weapon in Ella Mai, and the sky's the limit for the budding star."

Track listing
Credits adapted from Tidal

Charts

Weekly charts

Year-end charts

References

2017 EPs
Ella Mai albums
Albums produced by DJ Mustard
Contemporary R&B EPs